Jack Spencer (born 21 December 1990) is a former rugby league footballer who last played for Swinton Lions in the RFL League 1.

Playing career

Oldham RLFC
He was previously at Oldham (Heritage № 1352) in Betfred League 1.

He previously played for Folly Lane ARLFC  (in Pendlebury) and Salford City Reds in the Super League.

Swinton Lions
On 22 October 2021, it was reported that he had signed for Swinton in the RFL League 1.

References

External links
Oldham profile
Statistics at rugbyleagueproject.org
Search for "Jack Spencer" at weststigers.com.au
Search for "Jack Spencer" AND "Rugby League" at BBC → Sport
Spencer begins his Wests Tigers Career

1990 births
Living people
Balmain Ryde-Eastwood Tigers players
Barrow Raiders players
English rugby league players
Halifax R.L.F.C. players
Oldham R.L.F.C. players
Rugby league players from Swinton, Greater Manchester
Rugby league props
Rugby league second-rows
Salford Red Devils players
Swinton Lions players